Astro Quan Jia HD is a Mandarin HDTV channel owned and operated by a digital satellite television provider, Astro in Malaysia. The channel lineup consists of exclusive dramas, documentaries and variety shows mostly imported from mainland China.

External links
 

Astro Malaysia Holdings television channels
Television channels and stations established in 2013